Lann Glacier is a steep tributary glacier,  long, in the north end of the Admiralty Mountains of Antarctica. It was mapped by the United States Geological Survey from surveys and U.S. Navy air photos, 1960–63, and was named by the Advisory Committee on Antarctic Names for Roy R. Lann, a U.S. Navy cook at Hallett Station, 1964.

References

Glaciers of Pennell Coast